Ou Rumduol  is a khum (commune) of Phnum Proek District in Battambang Province in north-western Cambodia.

Villages
Villages in this area include:

References

Communes of Battambang province
Phnum Proek District